Eoin McCormack (born 1982) is an Irish hurler who played as a right corner-forward for the Kilkenny senior team.

McCormack made his first appearance for the team during the 2005 National League and became a regular substitute on the team over the following two seasons. During that time he won one Leinster winners' medal on the field of play, as well as two All-Ireland winners' medals as a non-playing substitute.

At club level McCormack is an All-Ireland medalist. In addition to this he has also won two Leinster winners' medals and three county club championship medals.

Eoin McCormack is a fine specimen of a man as well as a great Gaa player

References

1982 births
Living people
James Stephens hurlers
Kilkenny inter-county hurlers